A toothpick is a small thin stick of wood, plastic, bamboo, metal, bone or other substance with at least one and sometimes two pointed ends to insert between teeth to remove detritus, usually after a meal.  Toothpicks are also used for festive occasions to hold or spear small appetizers (like cheese cubes or olives) or as a cocktail stick, and can be decorated with plastic frills or small paper umbrellas or flags.

History 
Known in all cultures, the toothpick is the oldest instrument for dental cleaning. Hominin remains from Dmanisi, Georgia, dated to about 1.8 million years ago, bear lesions indicating the repeated use of a “toothpick”. A Neanderthal man's jawbone found in the Cova Foradà in Spain evidenced use of a toothpick to alleviate pain in his teeth caused by periodontal disease and dental wear. Toothpicks made of bronze have been found as burial objects in prehistoric graves in Northern Italy and in the East Alps. In 1986, researchers in Florida discovered the 7500-year-old remains of ancient Native Americans and discovered small grooves between many of the molar teeth.  One of the researchers, Justin Martin of Concordia University Wisconsin, said, "The enamel on teeth is quite tough, so they must have used the probes quite rigorously to make the grooves."

Materials and manufacture 
There are delicate, artistic examples made of silver in antiquity, as well as from mastic wood with the Romans.

In the 17th century, toothpicks were luxury objects and like jewelry, were artfully stylized using precious metal and set with expensive stones.

The first toothpick-manufacturing machine was developed in 1869, by Marc Signorello. Another was patented in 1872, by Silas Noble and J. P. Cooley.

Wooden toothpicks are cut from birch wood. Logs are first spiral cut into thin sheets, which are then cut, chopped, milled and bleached (to lighten) into the individual toothpicks. Nowadays other means of interdental cleaning are preferred such as dental floss, toothbrushes, and oral irrigators.

Dentistry 
Dentists generally prefer floss to picks because of possible damages to oral health, specifically to the gum, to tooth enamel (if chewed), to tooth roots (if the gum is pushed low enough). Picks may also damage veneers and crowns, have splinters, or be accidentally swallowed.

A review of small-scale studies indicates that toothpicks and triangular woodsticks are similar in their ability to remove plaque.

See also 
 Oral hygiene
 Teeth cleaning twig

References

External links 

 Video  - how toothpicks are manufactured

Further reading
 

Dental equipment
Oral hygiene
Eating utensils